This is a list of large earthquakes that have occurred in New Zealand. Only earthquakes with a magnitude of 6.0 or greater are listed, except for a few that had a moderate impact. Aftershocks are not included, unless they were of great significance or contributed to a death toll, such as the M 6.3 2011 Christchurch earthquake and the M 7.3 aftershock to the 1931 Hawke's Bay earthquake.

Earthquakes occur frequently in New Zealand as the country is situated in the collision zone between the Indo-Australian and Pacific tectonic plates, part of the Pacific Basin Ring of Fire, where many earthquakes and volcanoes occur. Most events occur along the main ranges running from Fiordland in the southwest to East Cape in the northeast. This axis follows the boundary between the Indo-Australian and Pacific plates. Large earthquakes are less common along the central Alpine Fault, where the plates are not subducting and the forces are accommodated in different ways.

The largest city within the highest-risk zone is the nation's capital, Wellington, followed by Napier then Hastings. All these cities have experienced severe earthquakes since European settlement. About 14,000 earthquakes occur in and around the country each year, of which between 150 and 200 are big enough to be felt. As a result, New Zealand has very stringent building regulations. The 1929 Murchison earthquake and 1931 Hawke's Bay earthquake led to the development of stricter building codes in New Zealand from 1935.

Quite early on, European settlers were faced with the reality of earthquakes in their new home. On 26 May 1840, the new settlement at Port Nicholson was struck by the first of a number of earthquakes and tremors. Early settlers learned fairly quickly the importance of using appropriate building methods in an earthquake-prone country. The 1848 earthquake, centred in Marlborough, caused great damage to the brick and masonry buildings in Wellington, and the city was rebuilt mainly in wood; consequently it suffered comparatively little damage in the 8.2 magnitude earthquake of 1855, which lifted the land 2–3m. Many buildings in Hastings and Napier were damaged in the 1931 Hawke's Bay earthquake. New building regulations meant that any new buildings constructed afterwards attempted to take earthquake shaking into account in building design.

Pre-19th century

19th century 
Information for earthquakes before 1840 are later estimates.

1900–1949

1950–1999

2000–2009

2010–2019

2020–present

See also
 Canterbury Earthquake Response and Recovery Act 2010
 Earthquake Commission
 Geology of New Zealand
 List of disasters in New Zealand by death toll
 List of tsunamis affecting New Zealand
 Shaky Isles – a nickname for New Zealand
 Volcanism of New Zealand

References

Further reading
 
 Eiby, G. A. (1957); Earthquakes (London, Frederick Muller) Page 159 has Table of (16) Major Earthquakes in New Zealand 1848–1942, from R. C. Hayes.
 Henderson, J (1937); The West Nelson Earthquakes of 1929, Bulletin No. 55 of Department of Scientific and Industrial Research (Wellington, Government Printer)

External links
 Geonet: NZ's geological hazard monitoring system
 GNS Science: NZ Government research site
 Simulation of a Magnitude 8.4 Megathrust Quake in New Zealand – GNS Science

 
Geology of New Zealand
New Zealand
earthquakes in New Zealand
Tsunamis in New Zealand
Earthquakes